Marcelle Matthews (born 19 April 1948) is a South African pair skater. With partner Gwyn Jones, she represented South Africa at the 1960 Winter Olympics where she placed 13th. She was 11 years old at the time.

References

 Sports-reference profile

External links
Official Olympics Website

South African pair skaters
1948 births
Living people
Olympic figure skaters of South Africa
Figure skaters at the 1960 Winter Olympics